Syed Saddiq bin Syed Abdul Rahman (born 6 December 1992) is a Malaysian politician who has served as the Member of Parliament (MP) for Muar since May 2018. He served as the Minister of Youth and Sports in the Pakatan Harapan (PH) administration under former Prime Minister Mahathir Mohamad from July 2018 to the collapse of the PH administration in February 2020. He is a founding member of the Malaysian United Democratic Alliance (MUDA) and has served as 1st President of MUDA since the founding in September 2020. He was also a founding member of the Malaysian United Indigenous Party (BERSATU), a former component party of the PH coalition and served as 1st Youth Chief of BERSATU from the founding in September 2016 to his removal from the party in May 2020. He is presently the sole MUDA MP.

In 2021, he was charged with several counts of corruption, including criminal breach of trust, misappropriation of funds, and money laundering. On 28 October 2022, he has been ordered by the High Court to enter his defense after the prosecution showed that there was enough evidence against him to prove that he probably committed the crime.

Early life and education 
Saddiq was born on 6 December 1992 in Pulai, Johor Bahru, Johor, Malaysia. His father is a Singaporean, who used to work as a construction worker in Singapore. His mother used to be an English teacher. The youngest of four siblings, he had studied at the Royal Military College (RMC) before continuing his studies at the International Islamic University Malaysia (IIUM) in Bachelor of Laws (LLB). During his time at IIUM, he competed in an Asian-level debate competition and successfully won the United Asian Debating Championship (UADC).  He is widely known in the debating community after having won Asia's Best Speaker award at the Asian British Parliamentary (ABP) Debating Championship three times.

In 2017, he allegedly rejected a counter offer to pursue his studies at Oxford University, England [Oxford University however denied the offer] to remain active in politics. A year later, after being elected as MP at the age of 25, Syed Saddiq once again allegedly dismissed another scholarship offer, this time rejecting the Chevening Scholarship proposal to pursue a Master in Public Policy at Oxford University.

In April 2021, he successfully completed the Lee Kuan Yew Senior Fellowship in Public Service Programme at Lee Kuan Yew School of Public Policy, National University of Singapore.

Political career

Early political career and formation of BERSATU
Saddiq as a law graduate came to prominence in 2016 when he joined 24 other youths, a group that called themselves Change Led by the Young Generation (Challenger), published a statement rejecting Najib Razak's leadership over the scandal of 1Malaysia Development Berhad (1MDB).

Saddiq was the leader of ARMADA (Angkatan Bersatu Anak Muda); the youth wing of the BERSATU. He has been a spokesperson for the party since its inception in September 2016 and is considered one of the founding members and sits on the party council.

2018 Malaysian general election, Minister of Youth and Sports
Saddiq made his debut contesting the 2018 general election (GE14) for the Muar parliamentary seat and was elected to the Parliament. He was then appointed as the Minister of Youth and Sports in the PH new government making him the youngest ever federal minister in 2018 since Malaysia's independence.

He is the youngest cabinet Minister to be appointed at the age of 25 as well as the third youngest MP after also 2018-elected Prabakaran Parameswaran (21) and 1976-elected Najib Razak (22) since Independence in the history of Malaysia. He was even called as  'cucu' , literally means 'grandson' for his youthfulness in the Parliament house.

Undi18 effort
As the Minister of Youth and Sports, Saddiq has pushed for a lower voting age, or eligibility to vote in Malaysia, from 21 to 18 years old ahead of the 15th General Election (GE15), an effort dubbed as "Undi18". However, he has agreed that first a political exposure programme for the young people of Malaysia is needed. In July 2019, Saddiq has tabled a Bill in Parliament to amend the Federal Constitution to lower the voting age to 18 but was withdrawn and re-tabled later after it was tweaked to accommodate some changes.
The Dewan Rakyat on 16 July unanimously passed the re-tabled Constitution (Amendment) Act 2019 bill to lower the voting age, as well as eligibility to contest in election to 18 and automatic registration of voters by Election Commission (EC). In November 2021, the constitutional amendment was finally gazetted which stated that Undi18 amendments would come into effect for implementation on 15 December as consented by Yang di-Pertuan Agong.

Expulsion from BERSATU
He became an Independent in May 2020 after being terminated as a member and first youth chief of the Malaysian United Indigenous Party (BERSATU), which was a component party of the then-ruling Pakatan Harapan (PH) coalition.

Following his expulsion from BERSATU, Mahathir and his-led MPs have formed a new party, named Party of Homeland's Fighters (PEJUANG). However instead of joining PEJUANG, on 21 August Syed Saddiq announced that he will be establishing a new multi-racial, youth-centric party.

Formation of MUDA
On 17 September 2020, Saddiq launched and co-founded the Malaysian United Democratic Alliance (MUDA) and was officially registered as political party on 23 December 2021.

Corruption charges 
In July 2021, he was charged with criminal breach of trust and misappropriation of funds belonging to his former party, BERSATU. For the first charge, Syed Saddiq, the then-BERSATU's youth chief, was charged with criminal breach of trust for withdrawing RM1.12 million via a cheque without BERSATU's supreme council's approval. He was charged with another accusation of misappropriating RM120,000 in BERSATU donation money intended for the 2018 general election. He had claimed trial to both counts of corruption and was released on bail of RM330,000 with additional conditions. He claimed that the allegations were brought against him because he refused to back the Perikatan Nasional administration.

In August 2021, Syed Saddiq had been charged again with two corruption charges of money laundering. According to the charge sheet, the accused transferred RM50,000 from his bank account to his Amanah Saham Bumiputera account on 16 June 2018 and another RM50,000 on 19 June 2018. Saddiq pleaded not guilty to the charges. He claimed that Wan Ahmad Fayhsal, the BERSATU youth chief, came to his house before he was accused and persuaded him to rejoin BERSATU and support Muhyiddin Yassin as prime minister. Although Wan Fayhsal admitted that there was a meeting with Syed Saddiq, he insisted that the meeting was not to make an offer or threat to Syed Saddiq.

On 5 July 2022, a witness, Rafiq Hakim Razali, in Syed Saddiq's trial said that Saddiq asked him to dispose of part of the RM1 million Bersatu funds. The RM1 million was in Syed Saddiq's possession.

On 18 July 2022, the High Court rejected Syed Saddiq's bid to impeach star witness Rafiq Hakim Razali due to his 'contradicting statements' in his ongoing criminal breach of trust trial. This means that Rafiq can still testify against Syed Saddiq in the trial.

On 19 July 2022, an MACC officer, Khairi claimed that the MACC is investigating Syed Saddiq for making false statements about RM250,000 that went missing. They went to his house to try to find out more information, and during the investigation, they seized a phone belonging to Rafiq Hakim Razali. Gobind Singh Deo, Syed Saddiq's lawyer, cross-examined Khairi and said that the act of going to Syed Saddiq's house was an abuse of power by MACC. Khairi denied that MACC had abused its powers, saying the investigation was launched based on information received.

On 28 October 2022, the High Court found that the prosecution had succeeded in proving a prima facie case against Syed Saddiq, and he was ordered to enter his defense on four charges of misappropriation of assets, money laundering and abetting in criminal breach of trust.

Views

Israeli-Palestinian conflict 
Syed Saddiq has been vocal in his support for Palestine and criticism of Israel. He has stated that Palestine existed long before Israel, and criticised Israel for illegally appointing themselves as the “guardians” of Palestine. He also stands firm with Malaysia's ban on Israeli athletes, and has called for the freedom of Palestine.

LGBT right 
During a forum on 1 September 2020, when Syed Saddiq was asked whether the MUDA party would accept LGBT members, he stated:

Controversies

Outspoken comments 
Saddiq is an avid social media user and regularly posts about political and social issues in Malaysia. In September 2015, Saddiq said he would "teach" Nurul Hidayah, the daughter of ex-Deputy Prime Minister Ahmad Zahid Hamidi, who criticized participants in the Bersih 4.0 demonstration. In November 2015, Saddiq admitted that he had supported Najib Razak, but later said Najib had embarrassed the country because of the 1Malaysia Development Berhad scandal. In October 2018, he said that Ketuanan Melayu had ended by calling the term nothing more than a mere meaningless phrase. His statement then evoked various responses from many parties. He defended the actions of four academics who allegedly submitted an executive summary on the Rome Statute of the International Criminal Court (ICC) to the Conference of Rulers and insisted their actions were part of the academic freedom promised by Pakatan Harapan (PH) in celebrating democracy and differences of opinion in Malaysia.

Relationship with Tunku Ismail Idris 
In 2019, he denied being in an "open warfare" with the Crown Prince of Johor, Tunku Ismail Idris. He responded on his Twitter to Tunku Ismail Idris that there were some parties that had considered it a “declaration of war”.

Probed for video on police brutality 
In May 2021, he was investigated by the Malaysian police for a video he posted on TikTok. In this video, he demanded justice for the late A. Ganapathy who recently died in police custody. Saddiq starts the video with the hashtag #justiceforganapathy and goes on to describe the serious injuries inflicted on Ganapathy that ultimately led to his death. Saddiq continues by saying "police brutality is a serious issue" and then he begins to list the names of the men that have died in police custody from the year 2009 to 2021. Saddiq then ends the video by encouraging viewers to "push for the IPCMC bill (to establish the Independent Police Complaints & Misconduct Commission) and to push for justice".

On 22 May 2021, the police brought Saddiq into the Dang Wangi District Police Headquarters, seized his phone and took control of his Instagram and TikTok accounts after being instructed to do so by the Malaysian Communications and Multimedia Commission (MCMC).  According to Datuk Mohd Azman Ahmad Sapri, the deputy director of the Bukit Aman Criminal Investigation Department, Saddiq was being investigated under Section 505(b) of the Penal Code and Section 233 of the Communications and Multimedia Act.

However, MCMC has denied instructing the Royal Malaysia Police (RMP) to seize Saddiq's phone, they merely "acted as a technical agency in assisting police investigation". Despite claims from Saddiq that this was a "politically motivated move orchestrated by MCMC", the MCMC stated that they will continue to "provide assistance and technical recommendations for the investigation without any hidden agenda including political agenda".

Election results

Awards and recognitions
 NONA Man Inspiring Award of the Nona Superhero Award - 2021.

See also
 Just Stop Oil

References

External links
 

1992 births
Living people
People from Johor
Malaysian people of Arab descent
Malaysian people of Yemeni descent
Malaysian people of Malay descent
Malaysian people of Singaporean descent
Malaysian Muslims
Malaysian activists
Malaysian political party founders
Leaders of political parties in Malaysia
Former Malaysian United Indigenous Party politicians
Independent politicians in Malaysia
Members of the Dewan Rakyat
Government ministers of Malaysia
Ministry of Youth and Sports (Malaysia)
International Islamic University Malaysia alumni
21st-century Malaysian politicians